Purga is a rural locality in the City of Ipswich, Queensland, Australia.

Geography
Purga is on the outskirts of  Ipswich.

The western boundary of Purga follows Warrill Creek.

Road infrastructure
Ipswich – Boonah Road (State Route 93) runs through from north-east to south-east.

History
The area was named after the parish which was derived from the Aboriginal word pur-pur, meaning a meeting place.

Purga Creek State School was opened on 1 September 1871. It was renamed Purga State School about 1945. It closed in 1967. It was at 68 Purga School Road.

Residents in the Fassifern Valley petitioned the Queensland Government to build a railway line to their district, and the first section of the Dugandan railway line was opened on 10 July 1882 as far as Harrisville. This is considered to be Queensland's first branch railway. Purga was served by three stations:

 Loamside railway station on the Ipswich Boonah Road
 Hampstead railway station on the Ipswich Boonah Road
 Purga railway station on the Ipswich Boonah Road

The branch was extended to Dugandan on 12 September 1887. The line closed in 1964.

Deebing Creek Provisional School  opened on 21 January 1895. In 1924 it became Purga Aboriginal State School. It closed circa 1948.

Heritage listings
Purga has a number of heritage-listed sites, including:
 68 Purga School Road: Purga United Church
 133-145 Carmichaels Road: Purga Aboriginal Cemetery

References

External links

 
City of Ipswich
Localities in Queensland